Nyctipolia is a monotypic moth genus of the family Erebidae. Its only species, Nyctipolia incondita, is found in French Guiana. Both the genus and species were first described by Schaus in 1916.

References

Herminiinae
Monotypic moth genera